Brachypodium is a genus of plants in the grass family, widespread across much of Africa, Eurasia, and Latin America. The genus is classified in its own tribe Brachypodieae.

Flimsy upright stems form tussocks. Flowers appear in compact spike-like racemes with 5-25 flowers on each short-stalked spikelet in summer. Leaves are flat or curved.

According to an October 18, 2010 issue of "Nature Online" Laura Longo, an archeologist at University of Siena in Italy found evidence of Brachypodium and cattail (Typha spp.) residues on prehistoric human grinding tools dated 28,000 years ago from Bilancino in central Italy.  A related article authored by Anna Revedin, Biancamaria Aranguren, Roberto Becattini, Laura Longo, Emanuele Marconi, Marta Mariotti Lippi, Natalia Skakun, Andrey Sinitsyn, Elena Spiridonova, and Jiří Svoboda, was contemporaneously published in the Proceedings of the National Academy of Sciences of the United States of America and clarifies that the grain residues resemble Brachypodium, based on a comparison to two modern specimens:  "Among these, the grains, which are slightly angular, with hardly visible centric, point-shaped hila and adequate dimensions (in the sample measuring 9–14 μm), appeared very similar to those of Brachypodium or related genera."

Species
 Brachypodium × ambrosii - Spain
 Brachypodium × apollinaris - Spain
 Brachypodium arbusculum - Canary Islands
 Brachypodium bolusii - Lesotho, South Africa
 Brachypodium × cugnacii  - Denmark, Ireland, France, Czech Republic
 Brachypodium × diazii - Spain
 Brachypodium distachyon - Mediterranean, Sahara, Sahel, southwest Asia from Portugal + Cape Verde to Sudan + Ukraine + Tibet
 Brachypodium firmifolium - Cyprus
 Brachypodium flexum - Africa from Sierra Leone to KwaZulu-Natal + Madagascar
 Brachypodium humbertianum - Madagascar
 Brachypodium kawakamii - Taiwan
 Brachypodium kotschyi - Turkey
 Brachypodium madagascariense - Madagascar
 Brachypodium mexicanum - Mexico, Central America, Venezuela, Colombia, Ecuador, Peru, Bolivia
 Brachypodium perrieri - Madagascar
 Brachypodium phoenicoides - Mediterranean from Portugal + Morocco to Greece
 Brachypodium pinnatum - Africa + Eurasia from Ireland + Morocco to China + Yakutia
 Brachypodium pringlei - Mexico (Nuevo León, Tamaulipas, Coahuila)
 Brachypodium retusum - Mediterranean + nearby areas from Portugal + Morocco to Ethiopia + Caucasus
 Brachypodium sylvaticum - Africa + Eurasia from Ireland + Morocco to Korea + New Guinea

formerly included
numerous species once considered members of Brachypodium but now considered better suited to other genera: Agropyron Anthosachne Arundinella Brachyelytrum Brachysteleum Catapodium Cutandia Distichlis Elymus Festuca Festucopsis Lolium Micropyrum Poa Ptychomitrium Rostraria Triticum Vulpia

See also
List of Poaceae genera

References

External links

Jepson Manual Treatment
USDA Plants Profile
Grass Manual Treatment
Botanica Sistematica

 
Poaceae genera
Taxa named by Palisot de Beauvois